Charles E. Smith may refer to:

Charles Eastlake Smith (1850–1917), British football player
Charles Edward Smith (jazz) (1904–1970), American jazz author and critic
Charles Edward Smith (Baptist) (1835–1929), American author and Baptist ecclesiologist and apologist
Charles Edward Smith IV (born 1967), American professional NBA player and 1988 Summer Olympics bronze medalist
Charles Emory Smith (1842–1908), American journalist and political leader
Charles Emrys Smith (fl. 1990s–2010s), British academic, economist, educator, author
Charles Emil Smith (1901–1995), American real estate developer and philanthropist in the Washington DC area
Charles E. Smith Co., established by the developer
Charles E. Smith (sailor) (1889–1969), American sailor who competed in the 1932 Summer Olympics
Charles E. Smith (P&R president) (1820–1900), president of the Philadelphia and Reading Railroad

See also
Charles Smith (disambiguation)